The SMW "Beat the Champ" Television Championship was the secondary singles championship for the Smoky Mountain Wrestling (SMW) professional wrestling promotion. The title was created in 1992 and was active until SMW closed on November 26, 1995. The storyline concept of the title was that the champion would defend his title every week against a "randomly drawn" opponent. For each successful defense of the belt, the wrestler won $1,000, and if the champion could win five title matches in a row, including the title win, then the title was vacated and the champion received a $5,000 bonus. In reality, the opponents were predetermined, and the winner never received the bonus. Moreover, the title was never represented by a belt. Because the championship is a professional wrestling championship, it is not won or lost competitively but instead by the decision of the bookers of a wrestling promotion. The championship is awarded after the chosen team "wins" a match to maintain the illusion that professional wrestling is a competitive sport.

Title history

References 

Smoky Mountain Wrestling championships
Television wrestling championships